National Institute of Agricultural Marketing (NIAM), or in its full name Chaudhary Charan Singh National Institute of Agricultural Marketing (CCS NIAM), is a research and higher-education institute operating under the Ministry of Agriculture and Farmers' Welfare of India and focusing on agricultural marketing. Established in 1988, it is located in Jaipur, Rajasthan, India.

References

External links
 

Agricultural organisations based in India
Agricultural marketing in India
Business schools in Rajasthan
Universities and colleges in Jaipur
Ministry of Agriculture & Farmers' Welfare
Educational institutions established in 1988
1988 establishments in Rajasthan